Martin Summerfield (20 October 1916 – 18 July 1996) was an American physicist and rocket scientist, a co-founder of Aerojet, head of Princeton University propulsion and combustion laboratory.

Life and career 

Summerfield received B.S. degree in Physics from Brooklyn College. He received his M.S. and Ph.D. degrees at California Institute of Technology  in 1937 and 1941, respectively. He was elected as a member of the National Academy of Engineering in 1979.

References

External links 
 

1916 births
1996 deaths
20th-century American physicists
American aerospace engineers
Princeton University faculty
California Institute of Technology alumni
Brooklyn College alumni
Members of the United States National Academy of Engineering
20th-century American engineers